Zana Khan district is a mountainous district in Ghazni province, Afghanistan with more than 12,000 people living there (100% Pashtun). The district center is Dado.

The district is within the heartland of the Andar tribe of Ghilji Pashtuns. Continuing drought is the main problem as in the whole province. It seriously affects agriculture, the main source of income. Health and education services need serious improvement.

Zana Khan district is currently under occupation of the Taliban and has been since August 2017.

Healthcare

Politics & Governance

Agriculture 
Land condition in 2002 found 20% of arable land in use.
 Main crops: wheat, alfalfa, maize and barley.
 Animal husbandry: sheep, goats and cows.

Education

Infrastructure

See also 
 Districts of Afghanistan
 Ghazni Province

External links 
 Map of Settlements AIMS, May 2002

References 

Districts of Ghazni Province